Ihitte Ogwa is a village in southeastern Nigeria located near the city of Owerri, Imo State.

References 

Villages in Igboland
Towns in Imo State